Sanjeev Kanoria is a London-based liver transplant surgeon, and healthcare entrepreneur. He is the chairman of Advinia HealthCare as well as the owner and vice-chairman of the supervisory board of Austrian Anadi Bank.

Kanoria is also the founder of Suasth Hospital, a 350 bed multispecialty hospital in Navi Mumbai. The facility combines science and spirituality; complementing technological advancements are its healing garden and meditation centre, under the Yogoda Satsanga Society which is a legacy of the famous master Paramahansa Yogananda.

He is the son of Hari Prasad and Champa Devi Kanoria - and brother of Hemant Kanoria, chairman of Indian group SREI Infrastructure Finance Limited.

Medical career 
Kanoria trained at King's College London and Royal Free Hospital, London. He has worked for over 15 years in the area of liver transplant and hepato-pancreato-biliary surgery and is a Fellow of the Royal College of Surgeons as well as being included on the General Medical Council Specialist Register.
Kanoria has a PhD from University College London for his research on reducing liver injury. He is the co-author of the chapter on liver disease in the Bailey & Love surgery textbook (26th edition).
After receiving an MBA from London Business School and North Western University in 1997, Kanoria served as a consultant in Healthcare, Strategy & Finance at McKinsey & Co until 1999.

In January 2019, he co-wrote a chapter, Dealing with Different Cultures: Overcoming Challenges of Service Design in a Multicultural World: Theory, Concepts, Practice to the book Service Design and Service Thinking in Healthcare and Hospital Management.

Austrian Anadi Bank 
In 2013, Kanoria acquired the domestic banking unit of Austrian bank Hypo Alpe Adria, founded in 1896, for around €65.5m. The bank, renamed Austrian Anadi Bank, has corporate, retail and public finance divisions and assets totaling €2.9 billion.

Advinia Health Care 
In 1999, having left McKinsey, he started a private healthcare provider with his wife Sangita Kanoria, Advinia Health Care. He co-founded Advinia. In February 2018, Advinia Health Care acquired 22 care homes and 2,700 beds from Bupa in a move which put it among the top ten private care providers in the UK. Today, Advinia operates 38 care homes with 3,250 beds and is valued at over 250 million pounds.  
In 2017, Advinia Healthcare became the first care provider in the UK to research the use of robots in care homes, within the EU-Japan project CARESSES led by University of Genova. The 2 million euro EU-funded project in partnership with University of Genova, Middlesex University, University of Bedfordshire, Örebro University, SoftBank, Japan Advanced Institute of Science and Technology, Nagoya University and Chubu University,  started in January 2017  and ended in January 2020. The Pepper robot, owned by Softbank, was embedded with an Artificial Intelligence developed in the project and designed to interact with older people in a culturally competent way to address their needs.

Dr. Kanoria received the Healthcare Economist of the Year 2014 at the Pharma Leaders Power Brand Awards.

Personal life 
In 2016, he was one of 80 British-Indian business leaders who signed a letter outlining the benefits of the UK's membership in the European Union.

References 

1963 births
Living people
Rajasthani people
St. Xavier's College, Kolkata alumni
Alumni of King's College London
Alumni of University College London
La Martiniere Calcutta alumni
Indian chairpersons of corporations
Chief executives in the finance industry